Robyn Benincasa is an American endurance racer, adventure racer, author, and motivational speaker. She was a competitor in several seasons of the Eco-Challenge: The Expedition Race reality television show. Her team won the 2000 Eco-Challenge in Borneo. She went on to found or co-found two companies focused on team-building for corporate clients. She is the founder of Project Athena, a nonprofit organization that helps women who have experienced medical challenges to fulfill their athletic ambitions. She holds three Guinness World Records.

Athletic career 
While serving as a firefighter in San Diego, California, Benincasa became a successful endurance racer and triathlete. In 1995, she was a member of the second American team to complete the Raid Gauloises adventure race. In 1997, she was on the Mountain Dew-sponsored team in the Discovery Channel Eco-Challenge in Queensland, Australia. She was on the Eco-Internet team in 1999 and 2000, and contributed to that team's first-place victory in 2000. She was dropped from the team in 2001 due to a struggle with asthma brought on by exercise and altitude during a race in Switzerland. She was treated for the ailment, and stepped in to join Team Earthlink, which had lost one of its members for the 2001 Eco-Challenge in New Zealand. Benincasa and Team Earthlink finished in fourth place.

Guinness Records 
Benincasa has earned three Guinness World Records. Her first was in 2010, for the farthest distance travelled by a woman by canoe or kayak on flat water. In 2011, Benincasa set a Guinness World Record for the farthest distance travelled by a woman by canoe or kayak in 24 hours on moving water. She kayaked  on the Yukon River in Canada. She accomplished this by paddling laps around an island in Huntington Harbor in Huntington Beach, California.

Business career 
In 1998, Benincasa, fellow-firefighter and Eco-Internet teammate Ian Adamson, and ultra-marathoner Liz Hafer founded Colorado Adventure Training. The three co-founders brought their experience as teammates in endurance races to build team-building experiences that encourage participants to learn to ask each other for support and to provide it. Following Adamson's dropping Benincasa from the Eco-Internet team in 2001, Benincasa ended her relationship with the company. She later founded Human Synergy, Inc., also focusing on corporate team-building, using a framework of "Eight Essential Elements of Human Synergy." In 2012, she published the book How Winning Works : 8 Essential Leadership Lessons From The Toughest Teams On Earth.

Benincasa was diagnosed with osteoarthritis in 2007 and was told that she might not be able to run again. Determined to continue her athletic endeavors, she underwent hip resurfacing surgery and ran the Sedona Marathon four months later. Following her recovery, she founded Project Athena, a nonprofit organization dedicated to supporting women pursue their athletic dreams after suffering medical setbacks. In 2014, CNN named Benincasa a CNN Hero, citing the work of Project Athena and the 140 women the project had supported at the time.

References

External links 
Benincasa's professional website

Adventure racing
Living people
Year of birth missing (living people)
American firefighters
Sportspeople from San Diego
Guinness World Records